Parliamentary elections were held in Brazil on 19 January 1947. The elections were for 19 vacant seats in the Chamber of Deputies, one additional Senator for each state (except Santa Catarina, which elected two), and for all state Governors and legislatures. 

The elections were most notable for the continued growth of the Brazilian Communist Party, which received 9% of the vote in the state elections, becoming the third party in the state of São Paulo (ahead of the UDN) and the single largest party in the federal capital, Rio de Janeiro. The PCB's growing success and its unpopularity amongst the ruling elite led to the party being banned later in 1947 by President Eurico Gaspar Dutra.

Results

Chamber of Deputies

Senate

State assemblies

References

General elections in Brazil
Brazil
1947 in Brazil
January 1947 events in South America
Election and referendum articles with incomplete results